឴
Victorino Aranas Manuel (born June 18, 1987) is a Filipino professional basketball player for the San Miguel Beermen of the Philippine Basketball Association (PBA).

Amateur career
Manuel possessed tremendous athleticism and agility uncommon for athletes his size. He played college ball at Philippine School of Business Administration as a member of PSBA Jaguars varsity squad under Coach Joseph Ocampo where he was awarded UCAA Most Valuable Player. He  first rose from obscurity two years ago when he stole the spotlight from older, more experienced players to capture the PBL MVP plum as a player of Pharex B-Complex.

He also suited up for the Cebuana Lhuillier Gems in the PBA D-League where he was awarded PBA D-League Aspirants Cup  Best Player of the Conference honors, after averaging 15.9 points and 8.3 rebounds per game.

Professional career
Manuel was drafted ninth overall by GlobalPort Batang Pier in the 2012 PBA draft.  After spending one season at GlobalPort, he was acquired by Meralco in 2013.

On July 12, 2013, prior to the start of the 2013 PBA Governors' Cup he was traded, along with Carlo Sharma to Air21 for Nonoy Baclao and swingman John Wilson.

On March 10, 2014, PBA Commissioner Chito Salud approved the trade that sent him to Alaska Aces in exchange for Aldrech Ramos. With this trade, he reunited with his former coach at Cebuana, Luigi Trillo.

On February 23, 2021, Alaska traded Manuel, along with two draft picks, to Phoenix Super LPG Fuel Masters for Brian Heruela and three draft picks.

On November 5, 2021, Manuel, along with Michael Calisaan, was traded to NorthPort Batang Pier for Sean Anthony, Sean Manganti and a 2021 second round draft pick. He never played for NorthPort as he was traded on November 8 to the San Miguel Beermen for Arwind Santos.

On September 4, 2022, Manuel won his first ever PBA Championship Philippine Cup

PBA career statistics

As of the end of 2021 season

Season-by-season averages

|-
| align=left rowspan=3| 
| align=left | GlobalPort
| rowspan=3|36 || rowspan=3|17.9 || rowspan=3|.477 || rowspan=3|.000 || rowspan=3|.606 || rowspan=3|4.1 || rowspan=3|.5 || rowspan=3|.6 || rowspan=3|.3 || rowspan=3|8.1
|-
| align=left | Meralco
|-
| align=left | Air21
|-
| align=left rowspan=2| 
| align=left | Air21
| rowspan=2|40 || rowspan=2|17.4 || rowspan=2|.541 || rowspan=2|– || rowspan=2|.698 || rowspan=2|4.5 || rowspan=2|.5 || rowspan=2|.2 || rowspan=2|.2 || rowspan=2|7.8
|-
| align=left | Alaska
|-
| align=left | 
| align=left | Alaska
| 57 || 18.0 || .500 || – || .672 || 4.6 || 1.0 || .5 || .3 || 8.6
|-
| align=left | 
| align=left | Alaska
| 41 || 21.7 || .535 || .000 || .718 || 6.2 || 1.0 || .7 || .6 || 13.7
|-
| align=left | 
| align=left | Alaska
| 26 || 20.2 || .493 || – || .744 || 5.2 || .7 || .3 || .6 || 12.9
|-
| align=left | 
| align=left | Alaska
| 50 || 21.5 || .485 || .400 || .716 || 4.9 || 1.2 || 1.0 || .4 || 16.0
|-
| align=left | 
| align=left | Alaska
| 22 || 23.8 || .450 || .000 || .851 || 5.0 || .8 || .6 || .3 || 13.2
|-
| align=left | 
| align=left | Alaska
| 12 || 27.1 || .444 || – || .761 || 6.1 || 2.2 || .6 || .5 || 15.6
|-
| align=left rowspan=2| 
| align=left | Phoenix
| rowspan=2|23 || rowspan=2|21.5 || rowspan=2|.482 || rowspan=2|.333 || rowspan=2|.680 || rowspan=2|5.0 || rowspan=2|1.3 || rowspan=2|.3 || rowspan=2|.7 || rowspan=2|13.0
|-
| align=left | San Miguel
|-
|-class=sortbottom
| align=center colspan=2 | Career
| 307 || 20.2 || .493 || .227 || .709 || 4.9 || .9 || .6 || .4 || 11.6

References

1987 births
Living people
Air21 Express players
Alaska Aces (PBA) players
Basketball players from Nueva Ecija
Competitors at the 2019 Southeast Asian Games
FIBA 3x3 World Tour players
Filipino men's 3x3 basketball players
Filipino men's basketball players
Magnolia Hotshots draft picks
Meralco Bolts players
NorthPort Batang Pier players
Philippines men's national basketball team players
Phoenix Super LPG Fuel Masters players
Power forwards (basketball)
PSBA Jaguars basketball players
San Miguel Beermen players
Southeast Asian Games gold medalists for the Philippines
Southeast Asian Games medalists in basketball